Gyrodontium is a genus of fungi in the family Boletaceae. There are three species in the genus, which have a widespread distribution.

References

External links
Gyrodontium at Index Fungorum

Boletaceae
Boletales genera
Taxa named by Narcisse Théophile Patouillard